Dalhousie railway station served the town of Bonnyrigg, Midlothian, Scotland, from 1832 to 1908 on the Waverley Route.

History 
The station opened on 2 June 1832, by the Edinburgh and Dalkeith Railway. The station was situated on the north side of an unnamed road to Dalhousie mains. The line was originally intended for goods traffic but there were  never any services. The tracks went over the Dalhousie Viaduct but they were deemed too narrow so it was demolished and replaced by the Newbattle Viaduct.

In September 2015, the Waverley Route partially reopened as part of the Borders Railway. Although the railway passes through the original Dalhousie station, it was not reopened.

References

External links 

Disused railway stations in Midlothian
Railway stations in Great Britain opened in 1832
Railway stations in Great Britain closed in 1908
Former North British Railway stations
Bonnyrigg and Lasswade